Jens Semjan (born 13 February 1979 in Ulm, Germany) is a conceptual artist and communication and media theorist.

Biography
Semjan studied fine arts from 2001 to 2006 as a master student of Joseph Kosuth, at the Academy of Fine Arts in Munich. As of 2011 he lived and worked in Brussels, Belgium and Munich, Germany. Throughout his career, he worked in different media to express his mostly political concepts. In an exhibition at the Baumwollspinnerei in Leipzig, Germany, in 2008, he showed different screenprints on steel, which were exposed to the elements for several months and therefore corroded to develop a new picture language.
Jens Semjan received grants from the Cultural Foundation of Allianz, Erwin and Gisela von Steiner-Foundation and the Karin Abt-Straubinger Foundation. His works are held in different collections including the Allianz SE and Alpine Bau Deutschland AG.

Budget project
Semjan advocated a critical review of the relative priority of educational institutions versus theaters and art museums: "museums and theaters should be provided with the opportunity to sustain an economic activity.“The Grand Insolvency Show is a polemic exhibition which focuses on a visionary and liberal idea of visual arts – Statistics. It projects 320 slides with confronting statistics, across a range of global themes via four Kodak carousel projectors. The exhibition was edited using publicly available data from global sources, but with the concept of turning serious statistical analysis into engaging art: The curves, columns and pie charts themselves are readymade pictures.

Publications

 Michel Dewilde, Jerome Jacobs: That's all Folks !, Stad Brugge, 2009
 artenews - Arts En Belgique, Bruxelles, 2009
 Holland Papier Biennale 2010, Rijswijk, 2010,

References

External links
Official site of Jens Semjan & Bernhard Lermann

German conceptual artists
Living people
1979 births
People from Ulm
Artists from Munich